Abbott Kahler, formerly known as Karen Abbott (born January 23, 1973) is an American author of historical nonfiction. Her works include Sin in the Second City, American Rose, Liar, Temptress, Soldier, Spy and The Ghosts of Eden Park.

Writing 
Sin in the Second City tells the true story of the Everleigh Club, a famous American brothel, and the club's proprietors, sisters Ada and Minna Everleigh. American Rose is an account of stripteaser Gypsy Rose Lee. Liar, Temptress, Soldier, Spy tells the true story of four women who became spies during the Civil War.

The Ghosts of Eden Park is about a German immigrant named George Remus, who quit practicing law and started trafficking whiskey. Within two years Remus had earned the title "King of the Bootleggers."

Abbott is a contributor to Smithsonian magazine’s history blog, "Past Imperfect", and has also written for the New Yorker.

Bibliography
 Sin in the Second City: Madams, Ministers, Playboys, and the Battle for America’s Soul (2007) 
 American Rose: A Nation Laid Bare: The Life and Times of Gypsy Rose Lee (2010) 
 Liar, Temptress, Soldier, Spy: Four Women Undercover in the Civil War (2014) 
 The Ghosts of Eden Park: The Bootleg King, the Women Who Pursued Him, and the Murder that Shocked Jazz-Age America (2019)

References

External links
 Abbott Kahler official website
 Karen Abbott official website
 New Yorker articles by Karen Abbott
 Smithsonian magazine articles by Karen Abbott
 

1973 births
21st-century American historians
Living people
21st-century American journalists
American women historians
American women journalists
Writers from Philadelphia
Historians of the American Civil War
Historians from Pennsylvania
21st-century American women writers